Lindsay Davenport and Lisa Raymond were the defending champions and won in the final 2–6, 6–4, 6–3 against Larisa Neiland and Arantxa Sánchez Vicario.

Seeds
Champion seeds are indicated in bold text while text in italics indicates the round in which those seeds were eliminated.

 Larisa Neiland /  Arantxa Sánchez Vicario (final)
 Lindsay Davenport /  Lisa Raymond (champions)
 Manon Bollegraf /  Natasha Zvereva (semifinals)
 Patty Fendick /  Mary Joe Fernández (quarterfinals)

Draw

External links
 1995 State Farm Evert Cup Doubles Draw

Doubles
1995 Newsweek Champions Cup and the State Farm Evert Cup